Hopewell is an unincorporated community in Cleburne County, Arkansas, United States. It lies at an elevation of 896 feet (273 m).

References

Unincorporated communities in Cleburne County, Arkansas
Unincorporated communities in Arkansas